Discoconchoecia is a genus of ostracods in the subfamily Conchoeciinae.

References

External links 
 

Ostracod genera
Halocyprida